Amélie Mauresmo was the defending champion but lost in the semifinals to Venus Williams.

Williams won the final on a walkover when Jelena Dokić withdrew with a strain of the right thigh.

Seeds
A champion seed is indicated in bold text while text in italics indicates the round in which that seed was eliminated. The top four seeds received a bye to the second round.

  Venus Williams (champion)
  Justine Henin (quarterfinals)
  Amélie Mauresmo (semifinals)
  Jelena Dokić (final, withdrew with right thigh strain)
  Monica Seles (semifinals)
  Sandrine Testud (withdrew with a neck inflammation)
  Magdalena Maleeva (first round)
  Silvia Farina Elia (quarterfinals)
  Elena Dementieva (quarterfinals)

Draw

Final

Top half

Bottom half

External links
 2002 Open Gaz de France draw

Singles
Open Gaz de France